

2 
 24/7 (24 Seven) United

A

B 
Biriwa Nkumisi FC}}

C

D

E

F 

  F.C. DADEKOTOPON

G

H

I

J

K

L

M

N

O

P

Q 
 Queens Park Rangers (Tema)
Quinta Trust Football Academy (Nungua)

R

S

T

U

V

W

Z 
 Zamalek F.C. (Takoradi)
 Zaytuna (Accra)
 Zongo JS
 Zoom F.C.
 Zurak FC
 Zum FC
 Zein United FC
 Zinaps Fc

Ghana (Women) Clubs 

 Abrem Super Blessing Ladies
 Abura Dunkwa Real Maiden Ladies
 Ada Ladies
 Akyawkrom Washington View
 Ampem Darko Ladies
 Ash Town Ladies
 Ashaiman Ladies
 Assin Foso Betinsin Ladies
 Assin North Ladies
 Athleta Ladies
 Bafana Ladies
Berry Ladies (formerly Halifax Ladies)
 Blessed Ladies (Kasoa)
 Bubiashie Starlets Ladies
 Cape Coast Ghatel Ladies
 Coegan Ladies
 Comsport Ladies FC
 Cosmos Ladies
 Dreamz Ladies FC
 Dynamo FC Ladies (Ho) 
 Elmina Bafana Ladies
 Envoys Ladies
 Fabulous Ladies
 Dansoman Faith Ladies F.C. (Accra)
 Ghatel F.C. Tamale
 GHATEL Ladies
 Ghatel Ladies (Kumasi)
 Ghatel Ladies (Sunyani)
 Ghatel Ladies of Accra
 GHATEL Ladies of Takoradi
 God's Kingdom Ladies
 Goldfields Ladies
 Great Mawuena Ladies
 Hasaacas Ladies
 Ideal Ladies
 Immigration Accra
 Impregnable Tesano Ladies
 Konongo Missiles Ladies
Kumasi Sports Academy Ladies
 La Ladies
 Lepo Stars Ladies FC
 Madonna Ladies
 Mawuena FC
 Meridia Ladies
Northern Ladies
 Oforikrom Ladies
 Olympique Marseille Ladies
 Osei Tutu Ladies
 Peki Ladies
 Pearl Pia Ladies
 Police Accra
 Police Ladies (Kumasi)
Police Ladies F.C. (Ghana)
 Port Ladies
 Post Ladies
 Real Meridian Ladies
 Reformers Sunyani
 Right to Dream SA 
 Rock Ladies
 Sharp Arrows Ladies
 Simew New Castles
Soccer Intellectuals Ladies
 Starlets Ladies
 Super Fire (Bekwai)
 Super Lions Ladies FC
Supreme Ladies FC
 Takoradi Ghatel Ladies
 Tema Bluna Ladies
 Tema Zion Ladies
 Tesano Ladies
 Western Ladies
 Valued Girls FC

References 

 For a complete list see :Category:Football clubs in Ghana
Ghana League - RSSSF

Ghana
clubs

Football clubs